Altenmarkt may refer to:

 Altenmarkt an der Alz, in Bavaria, Germany
 Altenmarkt an der Triesting, in Lower Austria, Austria
 Altenmarkt im Pongau, in Salzburg, Austria
 Altenmarkt bei Fürstenfeld, in Styria, Austria
 Altenmarkt bei Sankt Gallen, in Styria, Austria

See also 
 Altmarkt